Aleksei Aleksandrovich Chernov (born 25 March 1974) is a former Russian professional football player.

Club career
He played 5 seasons in the Russian Football National League for FC Lada-Simbirsk Dimitrovgrad, FC Lada Togliatti and FC Tom Tomsk.

Honours
 Russian First Division top scorer: 1997 (29 goals).

References

1974 births
Sportspeople from Volgograd Oblast
Living people
Soviet footballers
Russian footballers
Association football forwards
FC Lada-Tolyatti players
FC Tom Tomsk players
FC Metallurg Lipetsk players